Heliaeschna ugandica is a species of dragonfly in the family Aeshnidae, known commonly as the Uganda duskhawker. It is found in Angola, the Democratic Republic of the Congo, and Uganda. Its natural habitat is subtropical or tropical moist lowland forests.

References

Aeshnidae
Insects described in 1896
Taxonomy articles created by Polbot